Gauloise may refer to:

 The French name for someone from Gaul
 Gauloises, cigarettes
 French ironclad Gauloise
 a range of Belgian beers, brewed by Brasserie du Bocq

See also
 Gaulois (disambiguation)
 La Gauloise (disambiguation)